Devosia riboflavina is a Gram-negative soil bacterium. The species Pseudomonas riboflavina was transfer to Devosia riboflavina

Further reading

References

External links
Type strain of Devosia riboflavina at BacDive -  the Bacterial Diversity Metadatabase

Hyphomicrobiales
Bacteria described in 1996